Kerstin Naumann (born 17 September 1981 in Dresden) is a German rower.

References 
 

1981 births
Living people
German female rowers
Rowers from Dresden
World Rowing Championships medalists for Germany
European Rowing Championships medalists
21st-century German women
20th-century German women